A kula is an obsolete unit of measurement.  

In India, it was a unit of land area. After metrication in the mid-20th century, the unit became obsolete.
In Morocco, it was a unit of mass equal to 22 rotal, or 11.165 kg (24.61458 lb)

See also
List of customary units of measurement in South Asia

References

Units of area
Units of mass
Customary units in India
Obsolete units of measurement